Tylopsacas is a genus of flowering plants belonging to the family Gesneriaceae.

Its native range is Northern South America.

Species:
 Tylopsacas cuneata (Gleason) Leeuwenb.

References

Gesnerioideae
Gesneriaceae genera